USS Hempstead has been the name of more than one United States Navy ship, and may refer to:

 , a proposed seaplane tender that was cancelled in 1943 prior to construction
 , a proposed attack transport that was cancelled in 1947 prior to construction

United States Navy ship names